

Definition 
Let X be a subset of Rn.  Then reach of X is defined as

Examples 
Shapes that have reach infinity include
 a single point,
 a straight line,
 a full square, and
 any convex set.

The graph of ƒ(x) = |x| has reach zero.

A circle of radius r has reach r.

References 
 

Geometric measurement
Real analysis
Topology